Reading the Ceiling is a 2007 novel by Dayo Forster.

The book tells the story of eighteen-year-old Ayodele and explores three paths her life could take. Ayodele is a Gambian schoolgirl entering adulthood. One path takes her to university in England, and another to polygamy and motherhood. Owen Richardson, reviewing the novel in The Age, compared it to Philip Roth's The Counterlife. A reviewer for The Point praised Forster's use of local terminology and accurate portrayal of Gambian society, especially regarding the roles of women.

In 2007, Reading the Ceiling was shortlisted for a Commonwealth Writers' Prize. In 2019 it was one of the New York Times travel selections, "52 Books for 52 Places."

Forster was born in the Gambia, studied at the London School of Economics, and now lives in Kenya.

References

External links

2007 debut novels
Gambian novels
Bildungsromans
Novels set in the Gambia